Brault is a surname. Notable people with the surname include:

Jacques Brault (born 1933), French Canadian poet and translator
James W. Brault (1932–2008), American scientist, pioneer of Fourier transform spectroscopy and other forms of spectroscopy
Jean Brault, head of Groupaction Marketing and party in the Canadian sponsorship scandal "AdScam"
Marc Brault, Canadian diplomat
Michel Brault (1928–2013), Canadian cinematographer, film director, producer and screenwriter
Pierre F. Brault (1939–2014), Canadian television composer
Steven Brault (born 1992), American professional baseball pitcher
Sarah-Anne Brault (born 1989), Canadian olympian triathlete